Ulmus 'Morfeo' is a hybrid elm cultivar raised by the Istituto per la Protezione delle Piante (IPP), Florence, in 2000. 'Morfeo' arose from a crossing of the Dutch hybrid clone '405' (female parent) and the Chenmou Elm, the latter a small tree from the provinces of Anhui and Jiangsu in eastern China, The '405' clone is a full sister of 'Groeneveld', a crossing of an English U. × hollandica and a French U. minor from the Barbier Nursery, Orléans.

'Morfeo' was patented and released to commerce in 2011. It was solely propagated by the Georgio Tesi nursery in Italy, but production had ceased by 2020. The tree was introduced to the UK in 2006 (as 'FL509') by Hampshire & Isle of Wight Branch, Butterfly Conservation, as part of an assessment of DED-resistant cultivars as potential hosts of the endangered White-letter Hairstreak.

Description
'Morfeo' is a robust, fast-growing tree able to freestand at a very early age. The stem commences forking at between 1.5 and 2 m from the ground, the branches on juvenile trees with irregular patches of corky bark. The reddish branchlets bear mid - green elliptic leaves, < 120 mm (avg. 88 mm) long  ×  < 80 mm (avg. 56 mm) broad with 10 mm petioles. The leaves closely resemble those of the Field Elm, with typically asymmetric base and acuminate apex; they turn crimson in late October, before falling in early November. The sessile samarae ripen in mid May, and are narrowly obovate, 17–22 mm long × 9 – 13 mm broad with the seed offset next to the notched apex. In the UK the tree begins flowering in its fourth year, the perfect, apetalous wind-pollinated flowers appearing in mid March; the tree will usually begin to sucker from roots when aged about 5 years.

Pests and diseases
'Morfeo' has a very high resistance to Dutch Elm Disease. However, 'Morfeo' is  particularly susceptible to the phytoplasma phloem necrosis, commonly known as elm yellows.

Cultivation
'Morfeo' is (2019) only in commerce in Italy. The tree was introduced to the UK in 2006 as a potential host plant for the White-letter Hairstreak butterfly Satyrium w-album by Butterfly Conservation, and has proven the fastest-growing of 13 cultivars on trial on a shallow sandy, gravelly loam over Reading Beds, increasing in stem diameter by 2.1 cm per annum. 'Morfeo' is also tolerant of heavy winter-wet soils. However, as of 1 January 2018, import into the UK from Italy was prohibited, the plant unable to qualify for a phytopassport owing to the prevalence of elm yellows in the region of propagation. 
The cultivar was introduced to North America in 2010, at the National Arboretum, Washington, D.C. and released from quarantine in 2013; it is not known to have been introduced to Australasia.

Etymology
The cultivar is named for Morfeo (English: Morpheus), the Roman god of dreams to whom the elm was sacred. There was an elm in Morpheus' domain, upon which hung the dreams fashioned by the Oneiroi.  
From the Aeneid by Virgil, translated by Dryden:

Full in the midst of this infernal road,

An elm displays her dusky arms abroad:

The God of Sleep there hides his heavy head,

And empty dreams on ev'ry leaf are spread.

Accessions
Europe
Grange Farm Arboretum , Lincs., UK. Acc. no. 822.
Great Fontley Farm, Fareham, UK. Butterfly Conservation One tree, Elm Trials plantation, Home Field.
Icomb Place, UK. Three plants donated by IPP in 2011
Royal Botanic Garden Edinburgh, UK. Acc. no. 20110002
Sir Harold Hillier Gardens, UK. One tree in Plant Centre Field.  Acc. no. 2007.0258.

North America
National Arboretum, Washington, D.C., US. Two trees.

References

Hybrid elm cultivar
Ulmus articles with images
Ulmus